Kenneth Gerard Langone Sr. KSG (born September 16, 1935) is an American billionaire businessman, investor, and philanthropist, best known for organizing financing for the founders of The Home Depot. He has been a major donor to the Republican Party.

Early life
Langone was born in Roslyn Heights, New York, to Italian American working-class parents. His father was a plumber and his mother a cafeteria worker. Langone's family has been described as having "a lot of love, but not a lot of money." He was a student at Bucknell University and the New York University Stern School of Business.

Business career
In the early 1960s, Langone began his career at a Wall Street financial services company named R.W. Pressprich, where he helped develop new business. In 1968 Langone met and persuaded Ross Perot to let Pressprich handle Electronic Data Systems's IPO.  In 1969, Langone would be named Pressprich's president.

In 1974, Langone formed the venture capital firm Invemed. Langone organized financing for Bernard Marcus and Arthur Blank to found Home Depot. Now a national chain with over 400,000 employees, it is Langone's most notable business venture.

Langone has been on the boards of Geeknet, General Electric, Database Technologies, ChoicePoint Inc., Unifi, and Yum! Brands, Inc.

Langone was chairman of the New York Stock Exchange's Compensation Committee from 1999 to 2003. In 2004, New York Attorney General Eliot Spitzer filed a lawsuit against the New York Stock Exchange's former Chairman Richard Grasso to return $100 million to the NYSE that were part of his $139.5 million pay package. The lawsuit named Langone who had approved the pay package. Langone denied that the pay packages were illegal considering that the NYSE had direct knowledge of the board's decision. On July 1, 2008, the New York State Court of Appeals dismissed all claims against Grasso because the NYSE had changed its status from a nonprofit to a for-profit organization, which meant that the Attorney General had lost standing to sue Grasso.

In July 2022, Langone helped found a group of U.S. business and policy leaders who share the goal of constructively engaging with China in order to improve U.S.-China relations.

Personal life
He and his wife Elaine Langone have three children; Kenneth G. Jr., Stephen, and Bruce Langone.

He is a practicing Roman Catholic, and was made a Knight of St. Gregory by Pope Benedict XVI.

He lives in Sands Point, New York, and had previously lived on Elderfields Road in nearby Flower Hill.

Langone is a member of Sigma Chi.

On January 13, 2021, Langone said he felt “betrayed” by Donald Trump's actions regarding the 2021 storming of the United States Capitol, echoing Langone's comments from 2017 on the Unite the Right rally.

Philanthropy and political donations
Langone is a major donor to the Republican Party as of 2014.

In 2018 Langone pledged $100 million in funding towards a $450 million program to make tuition free for all medical students at the NYU School of Medicine. Langone serves as the chair of the Board of Trustees of the NYU Langone Medical Center.

In 2019, he donated over $5 million to the Animal Medical Center in New York City.

In 2020, the Open Discourse Coalition was founded with funding from Ken Langone and various Bucknell alumni. Langone currently sits on the Advisory Board. He co-authored a letter in the Wall Street Journal about the organization and why he and many other alumni felt compelled to create the entity.

He serves on the boards of The Ronald McDonald House of NY, CSIS, The Medal of Honor Foundation, and the Harlem Children's Zone.

In popular media
Langone is portrayed by actor Ray Iannicelli in the 2017 HBO Films production The Wizard of Lies. In the film, Langone rejects an offer to invest money in the schemes of convicted Wall Street swindler Bernie Madoff. Langone is extensively featured in the documentary Client 9: The Rise and Fall of Eliot Spitzer where he discusses his fierce rivalry with former New York Governor Eliot Spitzer.

References

External links
Firm Mines Wealth Of Personal Data,  Washington Post, loaded March 14, 2006
 ChoicePoint-FBI Deal Raises New Privacy Questions, consumeraffairs.com, May 16, 2006, loaded April 2, 2007
N.Y.U. Medical Center gets Another $100 Million Gift New York Times, April 16, 2008

1935 births
Living people
American businesspeople in retailing
American financiers
American corporate directors
American billionaires
American investment bankers
Businesspeople from New York (state)
Bucknell University alumni
General Electric people
Giving Pledgers
21st-century philanthropists
New York Stock Exchange people
People from Roslyn Heights, New York
Roslyn High School alumni
Flower Hill, New York
New York (state) Republicans
New York University Stern School of Business alumni
The Home Depot people
Yum! Brands people
Knights of St. Gregory the Great
American Roman Catholics
American people of Italian descent